The Russian First League 1996 was the 5th edition of Russian First Division

Overview

Standings

Top goalscorers 
22 goals

  Varlam Kilasonia (FC Lokomotiv St. Petersburg)

20 goals

  Karapet Mikaelyan (FC Sokol-PZhD Saratov)

19 goals

 Sergei Toporov (FC Zarya Leninsk-Kuznetsky)

18 goals
Nail Galimov (FC Lokomotiv Chita)
Sergey Maslov (FC Dynamo Stavropol)
 Oleksandr Pryzetko (FC Dynamo-Gazovik Tyumen)

17 goals
Vladislav Yarkin (FC Zarya Leninsk-Kuznetsky)

16 goals

 Mikhail Zubchuk (FC Fakel Voronezh)

15 goals

 Valeri Shushlyakov (FC Kuban Krasnodar)
  Valeriy Yablochkin (FC Shinnik Yaroslavl)

See also
1996 Russian Top League
1996 Russian Second League
1996 Russian Third League

2
Russian First League seasons
Russia
Russia